Cignal (pronounced as signal) is a Philippine satellite television and IPTV provider, owned by Cignal TV Inc., a wholly owned subsidiary of the MediaQuest Holdings Inc. under the PLDT Beneficial Trust Fund.

Cignal's prepaid electronic loading system is powered by Smart Communications Inc. Cignal uses VideoGuard encryption system to protect its content from signal piracy. It uses the SES-7 satellite to provide optimal coverage directly to the target markets.

History

Prior to the launch, the PLDT group had already intended to establish its own satellite television service after its media arm MediaQuest Holdings sold its stake in Beyond Cable Holdings to the Lopez Group, and a failed attempt on the acquisition of Philippine Multimedia Systems, Inc. (PMSI, owner of Dream Satellite TV) from businessman and then-PLDT chairman Antonio "Tonyboy" O. Cojuangco.

Using the satellite broadcasting franchise of Mediascape (formerly GV Broadcasting System), the new service was named Cignal and formally began its operations on February 1, 2009. PLDT spent PH₱1 billion for the rollout of the service.

During its first years, Cignal transmitted its broadcast with over 20 SD channels and HD channels via NSS-11 satellite transponder service.

In 2015, Cignal had reached 1 million subscribers.

Satellite transponder transmission
From 2009, Cignal broadcasts on NSS-11 satellite transponder service. But since 2012, Cignal utilizes additional broadcast on the SES-7 transponder service.

Competition
At present, Cignal competes in the DTH service against Global Satellite Technology Services' G Sat, formerly Sky Cable Corporation's Sky Direct was their competitor but was decommissioned on June 30, 2020, via alias cease-and-desist order.

Sports teams
 Cignal HD Spikers (women's volleyball team)
 Cignal HD Spikers (men's volleyball team)
 Cignal-Ateneo (formerly Cignal HD Hawkeyes) (PBA D-League)
 Cignal Ultra (Esports team)

See also
PLDT
Smart Communications Inc.
Sky Cable
Home Cable (defunct)
Sky Direct (defunct)
MediaQuest Holdings
DirecTV
Destiny Cable
G Sat

References

MediaQuest Holdings
Cignal TV
High-definition television
Direct broadcast satellite services
Telecommunications companies established in 2009
Mass media companies established in 2009
Television in the Philippines
Philippine companies established in 2009